Sergio Flores may refer to:

 Sergio Flores (soccer, born 1985), American soccer forward
 Sergio Flores (footballer, born 1995), Mexican football defensive midfielder